Launceston Central was an electoral division of Cornwall in the United Kingdom which returned one member to sit on Cornwall Council between 2009 and 2021. It was abolished at the 2021 local elections, being divided between the divisions of Launceston North and North Petherwin and Launceston South.

Councillors

Extent
Launceston Central represented the centre and north of Launceston, including the suburbs of St Thomas, Chapel and Kensey Valley Meadow. The suburb of Newport was shared with Launceston North and North Petherwin. The division was affected by boundary changes at the 2013 elections. From 2009 to 2013, it covered 192 hectares in total; from 2013 to 2021 it covered 206 hectares.

Election results

2017 election

2016 by-election

2013 election

2009 election

References

Electoral divisions of Cornwall Council
Launceston, Cornwall